Scandinavian Traveler is the inflight magazine of Scandinavian Airlines (SAS).

History and profile
Scandinavian Traveler was established as a successor to Scanorama, former inflight magazine of SAS. The magazine was first published in November 2014. It is published on a monthly basis and covers lifestyle- and travel-related articles. The printed magazine is published in English, and online versions of the magazine are published in Norwegian, Swedish, Danish and English.

The second issue of the magazine, published in December 2014, was suspended by SAS when it led to criticism of Norway's Progress Party due to the article by Swedish journalist Per Svensson. The article was concerned with the recent increase of right-wing extremist parties in Scandinavian countries.

Scandinavian Traveler has won numerous awards, for example, the Swedish Content Awards for its cover design of the issue Hit men in 2016. The magazine has 1.4 million readers monthly, and since the launch the online versions has had 1.3 million visitors.

References

External links
 Official website

2014 establishments in Sweden
English-language magazines
Inflight magazines
Lifestyle magazines
Magazines established in 2014
Magazines published in Stockholm
Monthly magazines published in Sweden
Scandinavian Airlines
Tourism magazines